Sabina is a village in Clinton County, Ohio, United States. As of the 2010 census, the village had a total population of 2,564.

History
The town of Sabina was laid out by Warren Sabin, after whom it was named, in 1830, on land originally entered by P. Neville. The original plat of the town was recorded on the 6th of December, 1830, and contained thirty-seven lots. By 1833, Sabina contained two stores and two taverns.

In 1859, the town was incorporated, and M. Morris appointed Mayor.

A group of archaeological sites known as the Beam Farm Woodland Archaeological District is located along Stone Road near the village.  Once inhabited by Adenan and Hopewellian peoples, the district is listed on the National Register of Historic Places.

Geography
Sabina is located at  (39.489243, -83.635079), along Routes 22 and 3 about ten miles east of Wilmington, the county seat. It is also located within an hour's drive of the Columbus, Dayton, and Cincinnati metro areas.

Sabina is located 31 miles south of Springfield and 47 miles southwest of Columbus.

Parks
Sabina contains 2 parks within its boundaries. Clinton-Fayette Friendship Trail starts at Melvin road and continues through Sabina ending at Borum RD. There is parking at Melvin, Reesville, Sabina park and at Borum road.

The Sabina park contains shelter houses and swing sets  with a walking path . There is a connecting path over the footbridge connecting to the Richland Township park.

Demographics

2010 census
As of the census of 2010, there were 2,564 people, 1,028 households, and 676 families living in the village. The racial makeup of the village was 97.0% White, 0.9% African American, 0.3% Native American, 0.3% Asian, 0.2% from other races, and 1.4% from two or more races. Hispanic or Latino of any race were 0.9% of the population.

There were 1,028 households, of which 32.4% had children under the age of 18 living with them, 44.2% were married couples living together, 14.6% had a female householder with no husband present, 7.0% had a male householder with no wife present, and 34.2% were non-families. 28.0% of all households were made up of individuals, and 9.6% had someone living alone who was 65 years of age or older. The average household size was 2.45 and the average family size was 2.96.

The median age in the village was 38.5 years. 24.2% of residents were under the age of 18; 8.9% were between the ages of 18 and 24; 24% were from 25 to 44; 27.5% were from 45 to 64; and 15.4% were 65 years of age or older. The gender makeup of the village was 48.7% male and 51.3% female.

2000 census
As of the census of 2000, there were 2,780 people, 1,075 households, and 762 families living in the village. The population density was 2,149.6 people per square mile (832.1/km). There were 1,173 housing units at an average density of 907.0 per square mile (351.1/km). The racial makeup of the village was 97.48% White, 0.61% African American, 0.29% Native American, 0.43% Asian, 0.07% from other races, and 1.12% from two or more races. Hispanic or Latino of any race were 1.15% of the population.

There were 1,075 households, out of which 35.9% had children under the age of 18 living with them, 49.4% were married couples living together, 14.6% had a female householder with no husband present, and 29.1% were non-families. 24.1% of all households were made up of individuals, and 9.2% had someone living alone who was 65 years of age or older. The average household size was 2.54 and the average family size was 2.98.

In the village, the population was spread out, with 27.4% under the age of 18, 10.5% from 18 to 24, 29.5% from 25 to 44, 20.1% from 45 to 64, and 12.5% who were 65 years of age or older. The median age was 34 years. For every 100 females there were 94.1 males. For every 100 females age 18 and over, there were 93.0 males.

The median income for a household in the village was $34,233, and the median income for a family was $35,795. Males had a median income of $31,556 versus $21,448 for females. The per capita income for the village was $16,481. About 11.8% of families and 12.9% of the population were below the poverty line, including 18.6% of those under age 18 and 7.5% of those age 65 or over.

Public services

Police
The Sabina Police Department has five full-time, one part-time and three auxiliary officers. Sabina Police is headquartered in the first floor of the Sabina Municipal Building. The department currently uses four police cruisers which include two Ford Crown Victorias, one Dodge Charger and a Ford Explorer.

Fire
Sabina is served by the Sabina Richland Wayne Wilson Joint Fire District (SRWW), which covers the village of Sabina and the townships of Richland, Wayne, and Wilson, they also provide mutual aid to Jasper and Concord townships in Fayette County. The fire station is located on South Jackson St. in Sabina. The fire district was formed in 1996, when the Sabina Fire Dept. mergered with the surrounding townships.

Health care
Sabina is about twelve miles from Clinton Memorial Hospital in Wilmington. This hospital operates the Sabina Health Center located east of town. As well, Fayette County Memorial Hospital is located twelve miles east in Washington Court House.

Religion
Most residents of the area are of the Christian faith; churches include: Sabina United Methodist Church, Sabina Church of Christ, Sabina Friends Meeting(Quaker), Sabina Baptist Church, Sabina Church of Christ in Christian Union, Trinity Church, Richland United Methodist Church, Community Christian Church, and Lees Creek United Church of Christ.

Community organizations
Sabina Area Business Association, formed in 2011, is a non profit organization of local businesses that raises money for the well being of Sabina, especially in preserving downtown Sabina. The Association holds an annual event called Family Fun Night to show appreciation to the residents of the Village for their support.

Utilities
Sabina is covered by the Sabina Telephone Exchange and Sabina Post Office which serves Clinton, Fayette and Greene counties. Sabina is also home to the Sabina Community Pool, Richland Township Park, and Sabina Village Park.

Education
Sabina is home of the East Clinton Local School District. East Clinton High School and Middle School are located about 5 miles south of town in Lees Creek. Sabina Elementary is located in village limits with around 400 students. Students in portions of the Fayette County area of Sabina attend Miami Trace High School. A few Sabina area students also attend Greeneview High School in nearby Jamestown, Ohio. Sabina is also home to the Sabina Public Library. The library serves the residents of Sabina and surrounding townships. Additionally, Sabina Public Library operates its New Vienna branch library in New Vienna, Ohio.

Notable people
 Mike Carey, politician
 Don DeVoe, college basketball coach
 John A. T. Hull, U.S. Representative from Iowa
 Sarah Doan La Fetra, temperance worker

Gallery

References

External links
 Village website
 Sabina Public Library
 Sabina Police Department
 Sabina Historical Society

Villages in Clinton County, Ohio
Villages in Ohio
Populated places established in 1830
1830 establishments in Ohio